Jefferson at Rest is the third full-length recording by American band Early Day Miners. Originally released on Indiana label Secretly Canadian.

Track listing
"Wheeling" – 4:55
"New Holland" – 4:02
"Jefferson" – 5:02
"McCalla" – 5:09
"Awake" – 7:18
"Into Pines" – 6:08
"Cotillion" – 5:07

Personnel
Dan Burton: vocals, guitar
Joseph Brumley: guitar
Rory Leitch: drums
Matt Lindblom: bass
Maggie Polk: violin
Erin Houchin: vocal

2003 albums
Early Day Miners albums
Secretly Canadian albums